The Amsterdam sex crimes case is a court case involving Robert Mikelson's abuse of babies in Amsterdam, the Netherlands. The defendant was Roberts Mikelson, dubbed "the Monster of Riga" by the Dutch press, who had worked at several daycare centres in Amsterdam and was accused of abusing 87 children as well as possession, production and distribution of child sexual abuse material (pornography). Mikelson was found guilty and sentenced to 18 years and 11 months in prison, followed by involuntary commitment.

Identification and arrest
The case of convicted sex offender Roberts Mikelson started in December 2010 with the broadcast in the Netherlands on the television show Opsporing Verzocht ("Investigation Requested") of images originating from the United States. Robert Mikelson and an unnamed child with a stuffed toy known as Miffy. As Miffy is originally a Dutch product, the investigators suspected the child to be Dutch. After the boy's grandfather realized the boy was his grandson, the police were directed to the child's sitter, Robert Mikelson. During a search of his house, computers containing a large collection of child pornography (46,803 photos and 3,672 movies, part of which had been unsuccessfully deleted during the broadcast) were found and seized.

Defendants
Roberts Miķelsons (in the Netherlands generally referred to as Robert M.) (born in Riga, Latvia, 14 September 1983) became a naturalized Dutch citizen in 2008. He was convicted of possession of child pornography in Germany in 2003 while working at a daycare facility in Heidelberg. In 2004, he married Richard van Olffen. From 2007 to 2009, he worked at several daycare centres of "het Hofnarretje" group, and from 2009 to 2010, at "Jenno's Knuffelparadijs". According to evaluations of the Pieter Baan Centre, a forensic psychiatric observation clinic, Miķelsons is a hypersexual pedophile with a personality disorder.

Richard van Olffen (referred to as Richard van O.), was accused of possession of child sexual abuse material (pornography) as well as sexual assault on an 11-16-year-old boy, both of which he was acquitted. He was charged with being an accessory to the crimes of Robert Miķelsons

Victims
Miķelsons confessed to the abuse of 83 young children, but he is charged with abuse of 67 because some of the parents preferred to keep their children out of the court records owing to privacy concerns. The youngest of these children was 19 days old at the time the acts were committed. The abuse took place at the child care facilities where Miķelsons worked, at the homes of the children he babysat, and at Mikelson and Van Olffen's home. Miķelsons admitted abusing the children and suggested, according to media reports, that more children might have been involved. According to the prosecution, Miķelsons carefully scouted his babysitting addresses for presence of heavy curtains and absence of nanny cams. He stopped the abuse when the children started to be able to talk.

Trial
The trial started on 12 March 2012 in the Court of Amsterdam, a Dutch court of first instance. It took place at "de Bunker", a strongly defended courtroom in Amsterdam Nieuw-West. During the preliminary motions the parents of the children were granted the right to speak during the trial (a right normally only granted to direct victims), a decision which was challenged by Miķelsons' attorneys. Upon the granting of the right to speak, his lawyers (Wim Anker and Tjalling van der Goot) requested substitution of the three judges, which was denied. The prosecution demanded a sentence of 20 years' imprisonment, followed by Involuntary commitment for Miķelsons and 12 years for Van Olffen. The TBS charge was based on a psychiatric report from the Pieter Baan Centre. The report was based solely on observation of his behaviour in prison, as Miķelsons had refused to cooperate with a psychiatric evaluation. According to the prosecution Miķelsons was "cold, calculating, refined and proud of his actions". Although Miķelsons pleaded guilty to the abuse, the defense demanded "almost full acquittal", stating that the search warrant for Mikelson and Van Olffen's house (and thus the photo and video evidence from the computers) had not been obtained correctly.
On 20 April 2012, the hearings ended with the "last word" of the defendants (as is customary in Dutch criminal law). Miķelsons indicated that he was sorry about his acts and that he should have done more to prevent his acts from happening:

Judgement in First Instance
The judgement was given on 21 May 2012. Miķelsons was sentenced to 18 years imprisonment, followed by involuntary commitment, while Van Olffen was sentenced to 6 years imprisonment. The search of the house of the defendants (in which the photographic evidence was seized) was deemed admissible and the judges considered the psychiatric evaluation in which Miķelsons was diminished responsibility asserted (a requirement for involuntary commitment) reliable. The diminished responsibility nor his cooperation during the investigation did not result in a lower sentence, due to the nature and level of organization of his crimes. Upon hearing this part of the sentence, Miķelsons threw a glass of water at the judge.

Mikelsons and Van Olffen were further sentenced to payment of a fine of in total €467,000 and  €365,000 respectively to the children. Further claims (for material damages to the parents) were deemed "too complicated" to be treated in a criminal court case, but could be claimed in a civil lawsuit. Non-payment will add 8 days imprisonment per child for Mikelsons and Van Olffen

Appeal
Miķelsons and Van Olffen appealed the judgement, which triggered the prosecution to appeal as well (a so-called "vervolg appel") in order to have more possibilities before the appellate court. The start of the appeal took place on 15 November 2012. The judges decided to allow a second psychological evaluation center Oldenkotte in Rekken on the request of Robert Miķelsons who indicated his willingness to cooperate. The parents also had the possibility to speak during the trial, as a new law making this right explicit had in the meantime entered into force.

On 26 April 2013 the court of appeal sentenced Miķelsons to 19 years imprisonment, followed by involuntary commitment.

Cassation
Miķelsons appealed the judgement to the Supreme Court of the Netherlands (Hoge Raad) in a cassation procedure, in which he is represented by Dirk Daamen. The Hoge Raad dismissed the appeal, in conformation with the advice of its Advocate-General. Due to the length of the procedure before the Supreme Court, which lasted over 16 months, the length of the sentence was reduced by one month to 18 years and 11 months.

Public reaction
The public in the Netherlands was shocked when the events surfaced. The public prosecution also stated during the case that the events shocked Dutch society and that it would therefore not be justified to request a lesser sentence than the 20 years demanded. The case has also had effects on male preschool professionals: according to an evaluation by the news agency NOS and the Belangenvereniging van ouders in de kinderopvang en peuterspeelzalen (Boink) (English: Organization for parents in child care and day care), tens of men have quit or have been fired as a result of changed public opinion towards men in the field, including negative reactions of parents.

Worldwide arrests
According to the Amsterdam police, the investigation of leads found on Miķelsons' computer has led, worldwide, to the arrests of 43 suspected child molesters.

References

External links 
 Judgments regarding Mikelson
 , Court of First Instance of Amsterdam (Rechbank Amsterdam)
 , Court of Appeal of Amsterdam (Gerechtshof Amsterdam)
 , Opinion of the Advocate-General of the Supreme Court (Hoge Raad)
 , Supreme Court (Hoge Raad)

 Judgment regarding Van Olffen
 , Court of First Instance of Amsterdam (Rechbank Amsterdam)

Day care sexual abuse allegations
Dutch case law
Child pornography law
Child sexual abuse in the Netherlands
Sex crime trials
2012 in the Netherlands
2012 in case law